Argentina competed at the World Games 2017 in Wroclaw, Poland, from July 20, 2017 to July 30, 2017.

Medalists

Competitors

Artistic roller skating
Argentina has qualified to the games 1 male and 1 female.

Beach handball

Argentina has qualified to the games their women's national team. The women's team won the silver medal in the women's tournament.

Summary

Fistball
Argentina has qualified at the 2017 World Games in the Fistball Men Team event .

Gymnastic

Trampoline
Argentina has qualified at the 2017 World Games:

Men's Individual Double Mini Trampoline - 1 quota 
Women's Individual Double Mini Trampoline - 1 quota

References 

Nations at the 2017 World Games
2017 in Argentine sport
2017